Self Made: Inspired by the Life of Madam C. J. Walker is an American drama streaming television limited series, based on the biography On Her Own Ground by A'Lelia Bundles, that premiered on March 20, 2020, on Netflix. It received generally positive reviews with praise for Octavia Spencer's performance; however it received criticism for various historical inaccuracies and artistic licence. For her performance, Spencer received a nomination for the Primetime Emmy Award for Outstanding Lead Actress in a Limited Series or Movie.

Premise
Self Made is a fictionalized depiction of "the untold story of black hair care pioneer and mogul Madam C. J. Walker and how she overcame the hostilities of turn-of-the-century America, epic rivalries, and tumultuous marriages to become America’s first Black, self-made female millionaire."

Cast and characters

Main

Octavia Spencer as Madam C. J. Walker
Tiffany Haddish as Lelia
Carmen Ejogo as Addie
Garrett Morris as Cleophus Walker
Kevin Carroll as Ransom
J. Alphonse Nicholson as John Robinson
Blair Underwood as Charles Joseph Walker

Guest
Bill Bellamy as Sweetness
Zahra Bentham as Nettie
Mouna Traoré as Esther
Roger Guenveur Smith as Booker T. Washington
Kimberly Huie as Margaret Murray Washington
Cornelius Smith Jr. as W.E.B. Du Bois
Joanne Jansen as Walker
Olivia Croft as Josephine Moreland

Episodes

Production

Development
On November 10, 2016, it was announced that Zero Gravity Management had optioned the screen rights to A'Lelia Bundles' biography of Madam C. J. Walker, entitled On Her Own Ground, with the intent of developing it into a limited series. The production was expected to be written by Nicole Asher, directed by Kasi Lemmons, and produced by Octavia Spencer, Christine Holder, and Mark Holder.

On July 6, 2017, it was announced that Netflix had given the production a series order consisting of eight episodes. Executive producers are expected to include LeBron James, Maverick Carter, Mark Holder, Christine Holder, Janine Sherman Barrois, and Elle Johnson. Lemmons is set to direct and executive produce the first episode. Production companies involved with the series are slated to consist of SpringHill Entertainment alongside Zero Gravity Management. The series premiered on March 20, 2020.

Casting
Alongside the initial development announcement, it was confirmed that the series would star Octavia Spencer as Madam C. J. Walker. On August 6, 2019, it was reported that Tiffany Haddish, Carmen Ejogo, Blair Underwood, Garrett Morris, and Kevin Carroll had joined the cast. On August 21, 2019, Bill Bellamy was cast in the miniseries. On October 15, 2019, Zahra Bentham and Mouna Traoré were cast in recurring roles.

Filming
Filming for the limited series took from July 26 to September 20, 2019, in the Canadian cities of Mississauga, Cambridge, Stratford and St. Catharines.

Reception

Critical response
On review aggregator website Rotten Tomatoes, the miniseries holds an approval rating of 68% based on 25 reviews, with an average rating of 5.66/10. The website's critics consensus reads, "Self Made doesn't always live up to its namesake, but there's no denying that Octavia Spencer's spectacular embodiment of the singular Madam C.J. Walker is a sight to be seen." On Metacritic, it has a weighted average score of 64 out of 100, based on 17 critics, indicating "generally favorable reviews". Other reviews report disappointment because of the fictionalization and inaccuracies in the storyline. Addie Monroe is a fictionalized character intended to portray Annie Malone, another self-made millionaire who actually was the mentor of Walker. She is portrayed as a villain while another falsification is the portrayal of Walker's daughter as a lesbian.

Accolades

References

External links

2020 American television series debuts
2020 American television series endings
2020s American drama television miniseries
English-language Netflix original programming
Television series by Warner Bros. Television Studios
Television shows based on biographies
Television shows set in Indianapolis
Television series by SpringHill Entertainment
Madam C. J. Walker